Luboš is a Slavic male given name meaning love and used mostly in the Czech Republic and Slovakia. In Slovakia with spelling Ľuboš. The name is a short form of names like: Luboslav, Lubomir.

Notable bearers 

 Ľuboš Bartečko, Slovak ice hockey player
 Luboš Bartoň, Czech professional basketball player
 Ľuboš Blaha, Slovak philosopher and politician
 Luboš Fišer, Czech composer
 Luboš Loučka, Czech footballer
 Luboš Kohoutek, Czech astronomer
 Ľuboš Kostelný, Slovak actor
 Luboš Kozel, Czech footballer
 Luboš Kubík, Czech former professional footballer and  manager 
 Ľuboš Micheľ, Slovak football referee
 Luboš Motl, Czech theoretical physicist 
 Luboš Sluka, Czech composer
 Luboš Zajíček, Czech jazz cornetist
 Luboš Vrbka, Bayer Crop Science

External links 
 http://www.behindthename.com/name/lubos18

Slavic masculine given names
Czech masculine given names
Slovak masculine given names
Masculine given names